Shannon Michael Kendrick Rick (born 21 October 1988) is a South African professional rugby union player, currently playing in France with French Rugby Pro D2 side SC Albi. His regular position is scrum-half.

Career

Youth

He then moved to the  academy and played for their Under-19 team in 2007 and their Under-21s in 2008 and 2009. He was included in the  squad for the 2010 Vodacom Cup competition, but failed to make an appearance.

In 2011, Rick then joined Varsity Cup side , where he made seven appearances.

Senior career

Later in 2011, the  drafted him into their squad for the 2011 Currie Cup Premier Division, where he made two starts. He made his debut in the competition proper against  in a 26–26 draw on the opening day of the season.

Albi

Rick once again played for the  during the 2014 Vodacom Cup, but then made the move to France, where he joined Rugby Pro D2 side Albi prior to the 2014–15 Rugby Pro D2 season.

References

1988 births
Living people
Border Bulldogs players
Griquas (rugby union) players
Rugby union players from East London, Eastern Cape
Sharks (Currie Cup) players
South African rugby union players
SWD Eagles players
Rugby union scrum-halves